Robert Pešut (born 1 December 1965), known as Magnifico, is a Slovenian singer of Slovene and Serbian descent.

Biography
His mother originates from White Carniola, which is a small traditional region in South-Eastern Slovenia. His father is of Serbian descent. His grandfather was a Serbian soldier who fought on the Salonika front in the First World War, to whom he also dedicated a song called "Pukni zoro" from his latest album "Montevideo, Bog te video" in 2013.

His musical path began with musical group U'redu, with whom he recorded his first album, Let's Dance (1992). After that, he embarked on a solo career, recording six albums in twelve years.

Discography
Selected discography includes:
Let's Dance (with U'redu), 1992
Od srca do srca, 1993
Kdo je čefur, 1996
Stereotip (soundtrack), 1997
Sexy Boy, 1999
Komplet (hit songs), 2001
Export-Import, 2003
Grande Finale, 2007 Look more
Srečno, 2008
Magnification, 2010 Look more
Montevideo, Bog te video, 2013''
Charlatan de Balkan, 2016

References

External links
 
 Official Website www.magnifico.si

1965 births
Living people
20th-century Slovenian male singers
21st-century Slovenian male actors
Slovenian people of Serbian descent
Musicians from Ljubljana
Hayat Production artists
Slovenian male film actors
21st-century Slovenian male singers